Ingrid may refer to:
 Ingrid (given name)
 Ingrid (record label), and artist collective
 Ingrid Burley, rapper known mononymously as Ingrid
 Tropical Storm Ingrid, various cyclones
 1026 Ingrid, an asteroid
 InGrid, the grid computing project within D-Grid

See also
 
 
 In-Grid
 Ingrid Marie apple cultivar